Giancarlo Corradini (born 24 February 1961 in Sassuolo, Province of Modena) is an Italian football manager and former defender.

Career

Playing 
Corradini started his career in his native Sassuolo, before moving to Genoa in 1978 and Reggiana in 1980. From 1982 to 1988 he then played for Torino. In 1988, he left Torino to join Napoli, where he won a Serie A championship title in 1990, a UEFA Cup in 1989 and an Italian Super Cup in 1990. He retired from playing football in 1994.

Coaching 
Following his retirement from playing football, Corradini became a youth team coach. He joined Juventus in 1999; in 2001, following the appointment of Marcello Lippi, he entered into the first team coaching staff, and in 2004 he was finally appointed as Fabio Capello's first assistant coach. Following the departure of Capello, he was confirmed beside new head coach Didier Deschamps for the Serie B debut season for the club. In May 2007, following disputes between Deschamps and the club management that convinced the Frenchman to resign from his post, Corradini was appointed caretaker coach of Juventus for the two final matches of the season, with Juventus already crowned as Serie B champions. In his first press conference, he introduced himself as a "little Mourinho" because he worked for and learnt from several top-rated football managers.

In his tenure as Juventus caretaker, Corradini did not achieve a single point, with Juventus losing to relegation-battling sides Bari and Spezia. The day before the final match, lost 3–2 at home to Spezia, he announced he was going to leave Juventus, citing his intention to find a full-time head coaching position. On 24 June 2007, he was successively announced as new head coach of Serie C1 club Venezia. He was sacked two months later on 30 August, after a 2–1 away loss to Cremonese in the second Serie C1 league matchday.

In November 2008, Corradini accepted to fill the vacant head coaching post at Serie D club Cuneo, which led to escape relegation at the end of the 2008–09 season. He left Cuneo in June 2009. In July 2012, Corradini was appointed assistant coach at Watford under their new manager Gianfranco Zola. He left in July 2013.

References

External links 
 Playing career
 Giancarlo Corradini at Footballdatabase

1961 births
A.C. Reggiana 1919 players
Association football defenders
Genoa C.F.C. players
Italian football managers
Italian footballers
Juventus F.C. managers
Living people
Sportspeople from the Province of Modena
S.S.C. Napoli players
Venezia F.C. managers
Serie A players
Serie B players
Serie C players
A.C. Cuneo 1905 managers
U.S. Sassuolo Calcio players
Torino F.C. players
Watford F.C. non-playing staff
UEFA Cup winning players
Italian expatriate sportspeople in England
Footballers from Emilia-Romagna